Grigore Eremei (born 22 April 1935) is a Soviet and Moldovan politician.

Biography 
Grigore Eremei was born in Tîrnova, Edineț.

From 5 February until 23 August 1991 he was the final First Secretary of the Communist Party of Moldavia, the republic level branch of the Communist Party of the Soviet Union. The Communist Party was outlawed by the government in August 1991, just after the Moldovan Declaration of Independence.

Works 
 Faţa nevăzută a puterii (Ed. Litera, Chişinău, 2003).

References

External links
  Biografie în limba rusă
 Timpul, 23 August 2006 - Grigore Eremei: „Interzicerea Partidului Comunist a fost un act nelegitim”

 

1935 births
Living people
People from Edineț District
Ambassadors of Moldova to Belarus
Ambassadors of Moldova to Israel
Ambassadors of Moldova to Romania
Deputy Prime Ministers of Moldova
Eighth convocation members of the Soviet of Nationalities
Ninth convocation members of the Soviet of Nationalities
Tenth convocation members of the Soviet of Nationalities
Eleventh convocation members of the Soviet of Nationalities
First Secretaries of the Communist Party of Moldavia
Politburo of the Central Committee of the Communist Party of the Soviet Union members
Recipients of the Order of Friendship of Peoples
Recipients of the Order of Honour (Moldova)
Recipients of the Order of the Red Banner of Labour
Romanian people of Moldovan descent